The 2002 Florida Atlantic Blue Wave baseball team was the intercollegiate baseball team of Florida Atlantic University for the 2002 NCAA baseball season.  It competed on the Division I level in the Atlantic Sun Conference.  The 2002 team became the first in school history to clinch a Regional championship and earn an appearance in the NCAA Super Regionals, by defeating Alabama in the Regional Championship game, 6-5.

2002 schedule and results

Regionals
The 2002 season saw FAU receive its third bid to the NCAA Division I Baseball Championship tournament; its first since 2000.  As an at-large selection, FAU was placed in the Regional bracket with the Alabama Crimson Tide, the Auburn Tigers, and the Southeast Missouri State Indians.  The top seed of the Regional was the national #3 seed, Alabama, who hosted in Tuscaloosa, AL.  FAU pulled off an impressive win in the opening game against Auburn, as both underdogs in FAU and SE Missouri State, won their first games.  Beating the Indians of SE Missouri State in the second round allowed FAU to roll right into the Regional championship game free of losses and avoiding the "Loser's Bracket" of the Regional.  Host Alabama played itself back into the Regional by defeating Auburn and SE Missouri State, eliminating both en route to the Regional championship game.  The Regional Final was set as the FAU Blue Wave and the top-seeded Alabama Crimson Tide.  FAU, winning its first two games, dropped the first meeting to Alabama, 7-2, forcing a second game in the Regional Final for the championship.  FAU pulled off the upset and clinched its first-ever Regional championship by defeating Alabama, 6-5.  The win sent FAU to its first-ever Super Regional appearance, placing FAU in the final 16 teams.

Super Regionals
After clinching their first-ever Regional championship, FAU moved on to the round of the final 16 - the Super Regionals. The Blue Wave faced the Georgia Tech Yellow Jackets, the #1 seed in the Super Regional bracket.  FAU and Georgia Tech met at Tech's historic Russ Chandler Stadium in Atlanta, GA in a best-of-3 series, with a birth to the 2002 College World Series on the line. Unfortunately for the Blue Wave, the heavily favored and top-ranked Yellow Jackets proved to be too much, pounding the Blue Wave in a two-game sweep.

Game 1

Game 2

Awards and honors

Freshman All-American
OF Jeff Fiorentino
2B Derek Hutton

All-Conference
First Team All-Atlantic Sun Honors
RP Tim McNab (Senior)
SP Danny Core (Junior)
SP Chris Pillsbury (Sophomore)
SP L.J. Biernbaum (Senior)
Second Team All-Atlantic Sun Honors
3B Mike Cox (Junior)
SS Bobby Spano (Senior)
Freshman Team All-Atlantic Sun Honors
OF Jeff Fiorentino
2B Derek Hutton

2002 MLB First-Year Player Draft
FAU players selected in the 2002 MLB First-Year Player Draft:

Notes and references

External links
 Atlantic Sun Conference Baseball Championship Record Book

Florida Atlantic Owls baseball seasons
Florida Atlantic
Florida Atlantic Blue Wave baseball
Florida Atlantic